The Critics' Choice Movie Award for Best Production Design (previously known as the Critics' Choice Award for Best Art Direction) is one of the Critics' Choice Movie Awards given to people working in the film industry by the Critics Choice Association. It was first given out as a juried award in 2001 and then competitively in 2010 onward.

Winners and nominees

2000s

2010s

2020s

References

External links
 Official website

A
Lists of films by award
Awards established in 2001
Awards for best art direction